Coup de Theatre may refer to:

 Coup de théâtre, a literary term for an unexpected event in a play or a theatrical trick
 Coup de Theatre (album), by Haiku d'Etat, 2004
 "Coup de théâtre", a 2015 TV episode of Les Mystères de l'amour
 "Coup De Théâtre", a track on the 2005 album Soleil 12 by Forgas Band Phenomena

See also
 Perry Mason moment, when information is unexpectedly and dramatically introduced In court proceedings